An Audience with... is a British entertainment television show produced by London Weekend Television (now part of ITV Studios), in which a host, usually a singer or comedian, performs for an invited audience of celebrity guests, interspersed with questions from the audience, in a lighthearted revue/tribute style.

History
The show's title began as An Audience with Jasper Carrott, for a normal six-part television series for the comedian. His first television show, it was broadcast in 1978 and produced by London Weekend Television (LWT). From 1980 onwards, the show became An Audience with...[name(s) of host(s)], with one-off special guest hosts performing in front of celebrity audiences.

The show was traditionally broadcast on ITV on Saturday nights, while some shows in the 1980s were broadcast on Channel 4. The show has been commissioned at varying intervals, with ten shows broadcast in the 1980s, followed by twenty in each in the decades of the 1990s and 2000s. From 1994 until 2011 there were at least one show, and often several, broadcast per year, with the exception of 2000 and 2003.

Some hosts appeared multiple times. Dame Edna Everage was host three times, while Freddie Starr, Ken Dodd, Joan Rivers, Shirley Bassey, Al Murray and Donny Osmond were all asked to return once. One show, for Jeremy Beadle, was hosted posthumously in 2008. In 2010, a five-part highlights series of the show, 30 Years of An Audience With, was broadcast on ITV.

More recent shows focused more on musicians and singers rather than comedians - the last comedian given An Audience with... was Al Murray in 2007.

An Audience with Jasper Carrott
The An Audience With title was first used in a television series produced by London Weekend Television (LWT) for the comedian Jasper Carrott, which aired for six episodes in 1978.

An Audience with...
From 1980, the show took on a format where a special guest would host a one-off show in front of a celebrity audience, and have their name appended to the title. Dame Edna Everage was the first host of An Audience with... in 1980.

The show has had numerous hosts since then, mostly comedians and singers. Occasionally, pop groups, actors and television presenters also hosted the show. Unusual hosts have included a puppet, Sooty, cast members of ITV soap opera Coronation Street, and boxer Lennox Lewis. The Spice Girls were the first pop group to host the show, in 1997. In 2006, An Audience with Take That was the first time the show was performed live. The second was the next show, An Audience with Lionel Richie.

Hosts were often joined on stage by special guests. Singer Lionel Richie was joined by Westlife, Lulu was joined in a duet with former husband Maurice Gibb, the Bee Gees performed with Boyzone, Ricky Martin was joined by Kylie Minogue, and Take That performed Relight My Fire with Lulu. All round entertainer Des O'Connor was joined on stage by Martine McCutcheon, and dueted with Lionel Richie in a version of "Three Times a Lady". Comedian Ronnie Corbett had his long-time comedy partner Ronnie Barker as his special guest, while Lennox Lewis had football player Ian Wright as his special guest conducting an interview with him.

Comedian hosts often involved audience members on stage, such as Brian Conley's sword-and-card trick on Christine Hamilton performed blindfolded and  Freddie Starr's act of seemingly throwing knives at a blindfolded Garry Bushell. Comedians will also interact with the audience, with Freddie Starr throwing maggots over Faith Brown, and Al Murray, in his Pub Landlord persona, spilling drinks over them. Singing based shows also sometimes involved comic relief, with Frank Skinner appearing in drag as one of Lulu's backing singers, and Kylie Minogue being joined on stage by Kermit the Frog for a romantic duet.

An Audience Without... Jeremy Beadle
After the death of the television practical joker Jeremy Beadle on 30 January 2008, ITV decided to commission An Audience Without... Jeremy Beadle, to celebrate his best work and raise money for some of his favourite charities. Broadcast on 16 May 2008, the show was hosted by Chris Tarrant, and included the results of an ITV public vote choosing his top-5 best ever pranks from his show Beadle's About. This episode was produced by Talent Television.

30 Years of An Audience With
In 2010, ITV broadcast 30 Years of An Audience With, looking back at the history of the series, with interviews from past guests, and clips from old shows. The show was broadcast in five-hour-long episodes, from 17 July 2010 to 14 August 2010.

Les Dawson
In June 1993, Les Dawson was due to record an edition of An Audience with..., but died a fortnight prior to the planned recording. On the 20th anniversary of the comedian's untimely death, ITV decided to mark the occasion with the use of a technology which gave the illusion he was on stage.

The chief executive of Musion Systems the company that provided the technology, told the Today programme's Sarah Montague: "...it's not actually a hologram but the world perceives what we do as holograms, so we call it holograms." He explained how the technology allows people "to appear as though [they are] on stage".

Adele 
On 2 November 2021, it was announced that the format would return for one night only on 21 November for a show hosted by Adele. The singer's fourth album, 30, was released two days prior, and this was the first televised performances of songs from the album in the United Kingdom. The special was filmed on 6 November, at the London Palladium, with the audience consisting of Adele's personal heroes, friends, musicians, actors, artists, sportspeople. In the United States, the special aired on 20 March 2022, on NBC. It debuted in New Zealand in May 2022, on TVNZ

List of episodes

Home media 
In 2007, selected An Audience with... shows were individually released on DVD. Prior to this, the October 1985 show featuring Billy Connolly had been issued on its own, both in VHS format and on DVD. Virgin Video released the extended uncut studio version, with a runtime of approximately 78 minutes, instead of the 50-minute television version. On 14 November 2005, Network released An Audience with Dame Edna Everage, which featured all three appearances, across two discs and became a bestseller.

As of 2021, eleven An Audience with... shows have been made available on the video on demand service, BritBox. The episodes available were hosted by Harry Hill, Billy Connolly, Bob Monkhouse, Sir Cliff Richard, Jimmy Tarbuck, Ken Dodd, Kenneth Williams, Peter Ustinov, Ronnie Corbett, Shirley Bassey and Victoria Wood.

An Audience with Adele was the first to be made available on the ITV Hub.

References

External links
.
.

1980 British television series debuts
1980s British television series
1990s British television series
2000s British television series
2010s British television series
2020s British television series
Channel 4 comedy
ITV comedy
Television series by ITV Studios
English-language television shows